Usini is a town and comune in the province of Sassari, Sardinia, Italy.

References

Cities and towns in Sardinia